Medaurus was the Illyrian guardian deity of the city of Risinium, and possibly a war god.

Description 

Medaurus is depicted as riding on horseback and carrying a javelin. As the protector of Risinium, it is possible that Medaurus was regarded as a war god. Dyczek et al. indeed note that a rise in religiosity has been later observed in the Danubian regions threatened by Germanic tribes during the Migration Period (375–568), especially the cult of Jupiter Depulsor repelling the enemies. Medaurus could have had a similar function among Illyrian soldiers fighting far from their home around the Roman limes.

The Lambaesis dedication also indicates that an equestrian statue of Medaurus had been erected in Lambaesis (North Africa), likely the replica of a monumental statue located in Risinium. Recent archeological research in Risinium suggests that the statue of Medaurus was set up on a base of at least 15x20m, and situated on the acropolis where it dominated the city.

Attestation 

Medaurus is mentioned in a dedication carved in Lambaesis by a Roman legatus native of Risinium (present-day Risan, Montenegro) and more scarcely in two other inscriptions found in Risinium and Santa Maria di Leuca (Lecce). The Lambaesis inscriptions are today lost, and the only remaining copies were made in the 19th century by the Polish Légion Étrangère soldier Joseph Konarzewski and the French historian Léon Renier.

The temple of Medaurus was located near the temples of Asclepius and Salus, erected ca. 161–162. The Lambaesis inscription was however not found in the temple of Asclepius, as it was initially thought due to imprecise indications given by Renier. The hypothesis of Medaurus as a god of medicine, often encountered in 20th-century studies, is therefore less certain. A fourth mention in a Vandal text from Africa, that could accredit the thesis of the medical god, is also unlikely, as it probably refers instead to the city of Madauros in Numidia.

Texts 

The author of the Lambaesis dedication is an unknown legatus from the Legio III Augusta (in service from 178? to 180) who participated in the Marcomannic Wars with the Roman emperor Marcus Aurelius, and was eventually nominated Consul. The dedication was engraved in two different times, as the author claims to have obtained the Consulship in the last 4 lines. The lacunas in the text are likely due to a damnatio memoriae, his name removed from the inscription as a punishment for a fault.

See also 
 Illyrian mythology

References

Bibliography 

Illyrian gods